The Bodousa Cup is an invitational football tournament in India, held across multiple venues of Assam and organised by Bodousa Sports Club annually under the supervision of Assam Football Association. The tournament was incorporated in 2009 and is named after Moran Bodousa, a historical figure in upper Assam. 

The 13th edition of the Bodousa Cup football tournament was held from December 4, 2021.

Results

References

External links
Bodousa Cup on Facebook

Football in Assam
Football cup competitions in India
2009 establishments in India
Recurring sporting events established in 2009